Ray Webster may refer to:
Ray Webster (first baseman) (born 1942 in Panama), Major League Baseball player
Ray Webster (second baseman) (born 1937 in California), Major League Baseball player
Ray Webster (footballer), Australian rules footballer, see Mike Cronin
Ray Webster (horseman), Australian horseman, see List of Melbourne Cup winners